Alexander Nevsky (1221–1263) was a Russian statesman and military hero, serving as Prince of Novgorod, Grand Prince of Kiev and Grand Prince of Vladimir

Alexander Nevsky may also refer to:

People
 Aleksandr Nevskiy (athlete) (born 1958), Russian decathlete
 Alexander Nevsky (actor) (born 1971), Russian actor, writer and director
 Alex Nevsky (musician) (born 1986), French Canadian singer-songwriter

Art, entertainment, and media
 Alexander Nevsky (film), a 1938 film by Sergei Eisenstein
 Alexander Nevsky (Prokofiev), the score by Sergei Prokofiev for the film, later reworked into a cantata
 Life of Alexander Nevsky, a literary monument
 Life of Alexander Nevsky (illuminated manuscript), a 16th-century illuminated manuscript
 Alex Nevsky (Crimson Dynamo), a third Crimson Dynamo character

Awards and honorable recognitions
 Alexander Nevsky (prize), a Russian national annual historical-literary competition
 Order of Alexander Nevsky, an order of merit of the Russian Federation
 Order of Saint Alexander Nevsky, an order of chivalry of the Russian Empire

Buildings and structures
 Alexander Nevsky Bridge, in St. Petersburg, Russia
 Alexander Nevsky Cathedral (disambiguation), the name of various cathedrals
 Alexander Nevsky Church, in Copenhagen
 Alexander Nevsky Lavra, monastery in St. Petersburg, Russia
 Alexander Nevsky Square, in St. Petersburg, Russia

Transport
 , a list of ships named for the saint
 , a naval frigate lost at sea near the Danish coast in 1868
 Icebreaker St. Alexander Nevsky, later renamed 
 Alexander Nevsky, a 
 , fourth generation Borei-class submarine which sea trials started at 2011
 Sikorsky Alexander Nevsky, see List of aircraft (Si)